Martin Kraemer (born 23 December 1987) is a German chess player who received the FIDE title of Grandmaster (GM) in September 2012.

Chess career
Born in 1987, Krämer earned his international master title in 2006 and his grandmaster title in 2012. He achieved his three grandmaster norms in the 2009/10, 2010/11 and 2011/12 Chess Bundesliga seasons. He won the German Rapid Chess Championship in 2013. He is the No. 17 ranked German player as of February 2018.

References

External links
 
 

1987 births
Living people
German chess players
Chess grandmasters
Sportspeople from Erfurt